This article is about transport in Petah Tikva, Israel.

Roads

Petah Tikva is enclosed by four highways - Geha Highway, Highway 5, Highway 40 and Maccabit Road (Highway 471, which opened in November 2007). Highways 4 and 5 are freeways within Petah Tikva. Road 483 connects Petah Tikva and nearby Rosh HaAyin, and Road 4713 connects it with Kfar Sirkin.

Another major road and perhaps the main transportation artery of the city is Jabotinsky Road (Road 481), which connects Petah Tikva with Bnei Brak, Ramat Gan and Tel Aviv. It is one of the busiest roads in Israel and the Tel Aviv Subway is expected to go through its length.

Railways
Petah Tikva has two railway stations – the Segula station, which is located near the Yarkon Interchange and is separated from the rest of the city, and the Kiryat Aryeh station. Both stations are near industrial zones and mainly serve commuters from other towns who work in Petah Tikva, not Petah Tikva's own population.

A railway station existed in a more central area in Petah Tikva in the past, on the former Tel Aviv – Petah Tikva line. Citing the success of the Be'er Sheva Center Railway Station spur, a plan for a train station near the central bus station of Petah Tikva was included in the Israel Railways secondary expansion plan (post-2013). However, it was frozen due to local opposition.

Light rail

The Tel Aviv Light Rail Red Line will pass through Petah Tikva as a ground-level light rail system, expected to be operational in 2022. It is planned to go through Jabotinsky and Orlov streets and works to expand the streets and create public transportation lanes started in 2005, and 2009 work on the first station of the light rail next to the Beilinson Hospital are in progress.

The Red Line depot will also be located in Petah Tikva, next to the Kiryat Aryeh business park.

Buses

A number of bus companies operate throughout the city, with numerous terminals. The Egged Bus Cooperative handles inter-city lines, the Dan Bus Company is responsible for lines from Petah Tikva to other cities in the Gush Dan area as well as to the West Bank (but not lines within Petah Tikva), while Afikim handles lines within the city.

The transfer of internal lines from Dan to Kavim was made in April 2006 amid severe opposition from Petah Tikva's residents. In 2016, the lines were transferred again from Kavim to Afikim.

The main bus terminal in Petah Tikva is the central bus station. Other terminals include the Sirkin Terminal, Beit Rivka, the Kaplan/Beilinson Terminal and the nearby mall, which is also a large transport hub. The main junctions of the city which serve as major inter-city bus stops are Segula Junction (roads 40/481), Ganim Junction (roads 40/483), Sirkin Junction (roads 40/4713) and Geha Interchange (roads 4/481).

In August 2009, Petah Tikva became the first city in Israel to deploy electronic signs on regular bus stations throughout the city. Six such stations were set up in the pilot run, and 50 are slated eventually.

Petah Tikva Central Bus Station

The Petah Tikva central bus station, abbreviated Petah Tikva CBS, is the main bus station in Petah Tikva, Israel. It serves Afikim, Dan, Egged, and Kavim buses. It is officially located on Zeev Orlov St. 64 on one side and Zeev Orlov St. 75 on the other.

The Petah Tikva CBS has four platforms, each of which contains a multitude of small bus stations – two platforms are in an enclosed area to the side of Orlov St. and serve Dan and Kavim buses, while the other two platforms are on Orlov Street itself and serve Egged buses.

As of today, The Petah Tikva CBS is under renovation. Most of the route moved to a temporary terminal called "Moshe Arn Terminal". Only the bus routes of Dan and route 385 of Kavim remained in the Petah Tikva CBS.

The following buses stop at the Petah Tikva CBS or at Modhe Arns Terminal. Many of their routes, especially Egged's, do not originate in the station but come from Tel Aviv.

Notes:
Most routes go both ways, but not all.
Some routes are tagged with alternate route – routes which are normally different, and don't stop at the Petah Tikva CBS, but do on certain occasions.

Egged

Afikim

Dan

Kavim

Metropoline

Tnufa

References

Petah Tikva
Petah Tikva